The Jealous Wall is a large 18th century Gothic folly made from limestone located in the Belvedere House and Gardens in Mullingar, County Westmeath, Ireland. It is notable for being the largest folly in Ireland. It was constructed by Robert Rochfort in 1760.

History 
Around 1742, Rochfort suspected his wife of adultery with Robert's brother, Arthur. She was imprisoned in their family home, Gaulstown House with servants for over thirty years as Robert had lost his interest in her, and could not bear seeing her. Whilst divorce proceedings were being prepared, Arthur had fled the country. He returned years later, which resulted in Robert bringing a case against him, and he died at Marshalsea debtor's prison as he was unable to repay his debt of £20,000.

References  

Folly buildings in the Republic of Ireland
Buildings and structures in Mullingar
Buildings and structures completed in 1760